Bois-de-Boulogne may refer to:
 Bois de Boulogne
 Bois-de-Boulogne (AMT)
 Bois-de-Boulogne: city in mountain region of Lebanon (Arabic: Ghābat Būlūnyā), 33 km from Beirut